Nicola Docherty (born 23 August 1992) is a Scottish international footballer who currently plays as a left sided defender for Rangers in the Scottish Women's Premier League.

Career
Docherty started playing with Falkirk Girls at the age of 10 and was called up to the Scotland under-15 squad in 2006. She continued to represent Scotland through the under-17 and under-19 age groups and was a member of the squad that qualified for the UEFA Under-19 Women's Championship finals in 2010. Docherty left Falkirk to sign for Rangers in the same year.

She made her full debut for the Scotland women's team in September 2011 against Finland.

In January 2012, Docherty joined SWPL champions Glasgow City. She moved to Rangers in February 2020, following their decision to adopt professional status.

Honours

Club
Glasgow City
 Scottish Women's Premier League: 2012, 2013, 2014, 2015, 2016, 2017, 2018, 2019
 Scottish Women's Cup: 2012, 2013, 2014, 2015, 2019
 Scottish Women's Premier League Cup: 2012, 2013, 2014, 2015

Rangers
 Scottish Women's Premier League: 2021-22,
 City of Glasgow Woman's Cup: 2022,

International
Scotland
 Pinatar Cup: 2020

References

External links

1992 births
Living people
Scottish women's footballers
Scotland women's international footballers
Footballers from Falkirk
Glasgow City F.C. players
Scottish Women's Premier League players
Women's association football defenders
2019 FIFA Women's World Cup players
Rangers W.F.C. players